This is page shows results of Canadian federal elections in the northern part of the province of Saskatchewan.

Regional profile
Like southern Saskatchewan, the northern areas traditionally feature a strong urban-rural split, although it is less pronounced here. The Conservatives swept here in 2004 and the former Canadian Alliance also nearly swept the region in 2000. The rural areas (except for far Northern Saskatchewan) are almost as conservative as their counterparts in Alberta. The far north with its high first nations population has stronger support for the New Democrats and Liberals, and the Liberals were able to pick up the far northern seat in 2006 in a controversial close election. While Saskatoon also has large Liberal support as well as traditional NDP support, this was diluted for much of the early part of the millennium by the riding map. While Saskatoon has double the population of a typical Canadian urban riding, until 2015 the surrounding rural areas were thought to be too thinly populated for ridings of their own. As a result, for almost two decades Saskatoon's four federal ridings included large blocks of rural territory, a major reason why the NDP and Liberals were shut out in Saskatoon from 2000 to 2015.

With the 2015 redistribution, Saskatoon is split between three ridings located almost entirely within the city limits.  The NDP won one Saskatoon seat in 2015, and also took the far northern seat. Those gains were reversed in 2019, as the massive Conservative wave that swept through Saskatchewan saw the party sweep every seat in the province.

2021 - 44th General Election

|-
| style="background-color:whitesmoke" |Battlefords—Lloydminster
|
|Larry Ingram1,7485.63%
||
|Rosemarie Falk21,33668.72%
|
|Erik Hansen3,71811.98%
|
|Kerri Wall2370.76%
|
|Terry Sieben1,8475.95%
|
|Ken Rutherford (Mav.)2,1626.96%
||
|Rosemarie Falk
|-
| style="background-color:whitesmoke" |Carlton Trail—Eagle Creek
|
|Harrison Andruschak2,0665.03%
||
|Kelly Block28,19268.61%
|
|Shannon O'Toole5,60813.65%
|
|Cherese Reemaul3790.92%
|
|Micheal Bohach3,7919.23%
|
|Diane Pastoor (Mav.)1,0532.56%
||
|Kelly Block
|-
| style="background-color:whitesmoke" |Desnethé—Missinippi—Churchill River
|
|Buckley Belanger5,53326.89%
||
|Gary Vidal10,03648.78%
|
|Harmonie King3,54817.25%
|
|Nasser Dean Chalifoux2151.05%
|
|Dezirae Reddekopp1,0024.87%
|
|Stephen King (Ind.)2401.17%
||
|Gary Vidal
|-
| style="background-color:whitesmoke" |Prince Albert
|
|Estelle Hjertaas3,65310.61%
||
|Randy Hoback22,34064.89%
|
|Ken MacDougall5,21415.15%
|
|Hamish Graham3641.06%
|
|Joseph McCrea2,3886.94%
|
|Heather Schmitt (Mav.)4661.35%
||
|Randy Hoback
|-
| style="background-color:whitesmoke" |Saskatoon—Grasswood
|
|Rokhan Sarwar6,46014.17%
||
|Kevin Waugh22,76049.91%
|
|Kyla Kitzul13,72030.09%
|
|Gillian Walker5561.22%
|
|Mark Friesen2,1084.62%
|
|
||
|Kevin Waugh
|-
|rowspan=2 style="background-color:whitesmoke" |Saskatoon—University
|rowspan=2 |
|rowspan=2 |Dawn Dumont Walker4,60810.84%
|rowspan=2 |
|rowspan=2 |Corey Tochor20,38947.95%
|rowspan=2 |
|rowspan=2 |Claire Card15,04235.38%
|rowspan=2 |
|rowspan=2 |North-Marie Hunter4050.95%
|rowspan=2 |
|rowspan=2 |Guto Penteado1,7784.18%
|
|Jeremy Fisher (Comm.)100 0.24%
|rowspan=2 |
|rowspan=2 |Corey Tochor
|-
|
|Carl A Wesolowski (CHP)195 0.46%
|-
| style="background-color:whitesmoke" |Saskatoon West
|
|Ruben Rajakumar2,7788.19%
||
|Brad Redekopp15,37945.36%
|
|Robert Doucette13,32839.31%
|
|Dave Greenfield3571.05%
|
|Kevin Boychuk2,0646.09%
|
|
||
|Brad Redekopp
|}

2019 - 43rd General Election

|-
| style="background-color:whitesmoke" |Battlefords—Lloydminster
|
|Larry Ingram2,4266.77%
||
|Rosemarie Falk28,03078.25%
|
|Marcella Pedersen4,09811.44%
|
|David Kim-Cragg6051.69%
|
|Jason MacInnis6621.85%
|
|
||
|Rosemarie Falk
|-
| style="background-color:whitesmoke" |Carlton Trail—Eagle Creek
|
|Rebecca Malo2,0854.64%
||
|Kelly Block35,31378.56%
|
|Jasmine Calix5,53512.31%
|
|Dean Gibson8731.94%
|
|Cody Payant7991.78%
|
|Glenn Wright (Ind.)3440.77%
||
|Kelly Block
|-
| style="background-color:whitesmoke" |Desnethé—Missinippi—Churchill River
|
|Tammy Cook-Searson7,22526.51%
||
|Gary Vidal11,53142.30%
|
|Georgina Jolibois7,74128.40%
|
|Sarah Kraynick5431.99%
|
|Jerome Perrault2170.80%
|
|
||
|Georgina Jolibois
|-
| style="background-color:whitesmoke" |Prince Albert
|
|Estelle Hjertaas4,10710.34%
||
|Randy Hoback26,89167.72%
|
|Harmony Johnson-Harder6,92517.44%
|
|Kerri Wall8392.11%
|
|Kelly Day7781.96%
|
|Brian Littlepine (VCP)1700.43%
||
|Randy Hoback
|-
| style="background-color:whitesmoke" |Saskatoon—Grasswood
|
|Tracy Muggli8,41917.03%
||
|Kevin Waugh26,33653.27%
|
|Erika Ritchie12,67225.63%
|
|Neil Sinclair1,3202.67%
|
|Mark Friesen6921.40%
|
|
||
|Kevin Waugh
|-
| style="background-color:whitesmoke" |Saskatoon—University
|
|Susan Hayton6,14613.07%
||
|Corey Tochor24,51452.13%
|
|Claire Card13,99429.76%
|
|Jan Norris1,4012.98%
|
|Guto Penteado6671.42%
|
|Jeff Willerton (CHP)3050.65%
||
|Brad Trost§
|-
| style="background-color:whitesmoke" |Saskatoon West
|
|Shah Rukh2,8637.34%
||
|Brad Redekopp18,59747.70%
|
|Sheri Benson15,70840.29%
|
|Shawn Setyo1,0422.67%
|
|Isaac Hayes7751.99%
|
|
||
|Sheri Benson
|}

2015 - 42nd General Election

2011 - 41st General Election

2008 - 40th General Election

2006 - 39th General Election

2004 - 38th General Election

Battlefords—Lloydminster
Blackstrap
Desnethé—Missinippi—Churchill River
Prince Albert
Saskatoon—Humboldt
Saskatoon—Rosetown—Biggar
Saskatoon—Wanuskewin

2000 - 37th General Election

Saskatchewan, North
Elections in Saskatchewan